Thunder Mountain High School is one of three public high schools in Juneau, Alaska. It was opened for the 2008–2009 school year. In its first year in operation it served grades 9–11; the Juneau School District wanted seniors (grade 12) to finish at their existing high schools.  Thunder Mountain High School is located in the Mendenhall Valley section of Juneau and draws most of its students from this area, although under an open enrollment policy, high school students anywhere in the district may attend any of the three high schools.

In August 2009, TMHS became an official a member of the Alaska School Activities Association and competes inter-scholastically with other schools in the state in athletic events and academic activities.  For athletics, Thunder Mountain is classified as 4A, which includes the largest high schools in the state.

As of 2022, 580 students are enrolled.  Thunder Mountain High School is physically located at 3101 Riverside Drive, Juneau, Alaska 99801.

Sports 
Fall Sports:

Football, Football Cheer, Cross Country Running, Tennis, Swim/Dive, Volleyball, Dance, Rifle, Drama Debate and Forensics, Robotics, Wrestling.

Winter Sports:

Basketball, Basketball Cheer, Pep Band.

References

External links
 Thunder Mountain High School website
 Juneau School District website

2008 establishments in Alaska
Educational institutions established in 2008
Public high schools in Alaska
Schools in Juneau, Alaska